An overhand (or overcut or drop) punch is a semi-circular and vertical punch thrown with the rear hand. It is usually employed when the opponent is bobbing or slipping.  The strategic utility of the drop relying on body weight can deliver a great deal of power.

External links
 BoxRec Boxing Encyclopaedia 
 Antenne WKA-France – Lexique des boxes pieds-poings (Rubrique "Formations", onglet "Ceinture noire")
 Lexique de Netboxe.com 
 Fiches pratiques de Netboxe.com

Movies
Overhand Right in Boxing
Overhand high shoot

Boxing terminology
Kickboxing terminology
Punches (combat)